Alfred Thomson  (date of birth unknown, died 12 October 1895) was an Australian cricketer. He played two first-class cricket matches for Victoria.

See also
 List of Victoria first-class cricketers

References

Year of birth missing
1895 deaths
Australian cricketers
Victoria cricketers
Place of birth missing
Melbourne Cricket Club cricketers